This is a list of international co-production films with Angola.

List

 
Angola